Life According to Agfa is a 1993 Israeli psychological-social drama film written and directed by Assi Dayan and produced by Rafi Bukai and Yoram Kislev. Starring Gila Almagor, Shmil Ben Ari, Irit Frank, Shuli Rand, Sharon Alexander and Avital Dicker, the film revolves around one night in a small Tel Aviv pub whose employees and patrons represent a microcosm of Israeli society – men and women, Jews and Arabs, Ashkenazi and Sephardi Jews, kibbutzniks and city-dwellers.

The film mainly is criticizing the themes across the Israeli society, and, predicts a somewhat apocalyptic future for mankind and Israeli society. The film was selected as the Israeli entry for the Best Foreign Language Film at the 65th Academy Awards, but was not accepted as a nominee.

Plot
Dalia (Gila Almagor), an older woman in her late forties, who ends each night with guys she gathers for a casual sex. Dalia is at a large Tel Aviv pub called "Barbie", which is an abbreviation of the name of the "Abarbanel" mental institution. Samir (Akram Talawi) works in the pub. The pub opens in the early evening, as every day. Nimi (Sharon Alexander), a lieutenant colonel who was wounded in a parachute, arrives with his soldiers at the pub. The group of soldiers is loud and beastly. At the same time, Ricky (Avital Dicker), a depressed girl, arrives by chance after her psychiatrist advised her not to be left alone so that she would not expire on her own.

She is harassed by Nimmi and a group of his soldiers, who treat her sexually blatantly. Benny (Shuli Rand) the cop manages to keep the gang away from Ricky, and the two go out to his apartment, not before he cuts the tires of Nimi's car and his gang. After they have sex, Benny leaves Ricky in his apartment, and returns to the pub, where he draws the soldiers' attention to the puncture in their machine, but does not reveal to them that he himself is responsible for the puncture.

Nimi and his gang get upset, and directly suspect Samir, the Arab worker in the kitchen. When the soldiers open with violent acts made by Samir, Benny prevents the commotion and sends the group home in a taxi. Nimi instructs the driver to take the soldiers to the base. After the riot ends, Benny and his partner embark on an operation to capture drug dealers. When he returns his partner and roommate Liora (Irit Frank), a waitress in the pub, unaware of his betrayal, is angry at him for leaving the injured Ricky in his apartment alone, but he is more preoccupied with the fact that the operation he planned failed, and returns to his apartment, where he finds Ricky and a teacher let her vacate the apartment.

While Benny is taking a shower, Ricky commits suicide by jumping out of a window. Benny does not notice Ricky's body, and returns to the pub. Levy (Shmil Ben-Ari), Moshe (Uri Klausner) and Malka (Rivka Neumann), a violent and rude bunch arrive at the pub, and treat the pub people with contempt, and especially Samir.

A violent confrontation ensued between Levy and Samir, which ended, again, so that the groups were thrown out by Benny. Eli (Ezra Kafri), the married partner of the pub's manager, Dalia, arrives at the pub with his wife in order to say goodbye to Medalia, who remains in pain, and consoles herself with Ralph (Yoav Dekelbaum), a UN soldier who happened to have her. Liora Benny decides to comply with the ultimatum given to him by his commander and move to serve in the periphery.

Cast
 Gila Almagor as Daliah
 Akram Tillawi as Samir
 Smadar Kilchinsky as Daniela
 Sharon Alexander as Nimi
 Shmil Ben Ari as Levi
 Avital Dicker as Ricky
 Irit Frank as Liora
 Ezra Kafri as Eli
 Dani Litani as Czerniak
 Barak Negbi as Sammy
 Rivka Neuman as Malka
 Shuli Rand as Benny

Critical reception
Life According to Agfa received near-unanimous critical acclaim, winning an Ophir Award for Best Film, and did moderately well at the box office. The film also received Honourable Mentions at the Jerusalem and Berlin Film Festivals, and was entered for the film festivals in Toronto, Montpellier, Calcutta and Singapore.

Dubbed by Judd Ne'eman a "stylized nightmare of self-annihilation", it has since become one of Israeli cinema's most important films.

See also
 List of submissions to the 65th Academy Awards for Best Foreign Language Film
 List of Israeli submissions for the Academy Award for Best Foreign Language Film

References

External links
 
 

1993 films
1993 drama films
Israeli drama films
1990s Hebrew-language films
Films about the kibbutz
Films directed by Assi Dayan
Films set in Tel Aviv